Toa Alta is a town and municipality of Puerto Rico located in the northern coast of the island, north of Naranjito; south of Dorado and Toa Baja; east of Vega Alta and Corozal; and west of Bayamón. Toa Alta is spread over eight barrios and Toa Alta Pueblo (the downtown area and the administrative center of the city). It is part of the San Juan-Caguas-Guaynabo metropolitan statistical area. There are nine barrios in Toa Alta and altogether in 2020 had a population of 66,852. Río de la Plata, is a large river that runs through Toa Alta. Toa Alta celebrates its patron saint festival in May.

History
Toa Alta is located west of the capital city of San Juan and was founded in 1751, making it one of the oldest towns on the main island of Puerto Rico. The construction of the San Fernando Rey Church in the main town square began in 1752. It is popularly said that the name Toa Alta comes from the Taíno word for mother or fertility, Thoa. Most likely the word toa comes from the Taino word for valley or mountain; the region is also known as Valle del Toa (Toa Valley).

Over the years, agriculture became an important economic force in the area. At the peak of the agricultural economy, the town was also known as the "Granja de los Reyes Católicos" (the Farm of the Catholic Monarchs). The town is also called Ciudad del Josco. The town is commonly known by its nickname La Cuna de los Poetas, or "Cradle of Poets", due to the numerous Spanish-language poets born there, such as Abelardo Díaz Alfaro and the musician Tomás "Masso" Rivera.

Hurricane Maria on September 20, 2017 triggered numerous landslides in Toa Alta. Many homes and roads in Toa Alta were destroyed by the hurricane.

Flood control project
In mid 2018, the United States Army Corps of Engineers announced it would be undertaking a major flood control project of a river that often causes flooding in Toa Alta, Río de la Plata.

Geography

Toa Alta is located on the Northern Coastal Plain in the Northern Karst zone.

Barrios
Like all municipalities of Puerto Rico, Toa Alta is subdivided into barrios.

 Contorno
 Galateo
 Mucarabones
 Ortíz
 Piñas
 Quebrada Arenas
 Quebrada Cruz
 Río Lajas
 Toa Alta barrio-pueblo

Sectors

Barrios (which are like minor civil divisions) in turn are further subdivided into smaller local populated place areas/units called sectores (sectors in English). The types of sectores may vary, from normally sector to urbanización to reparto to barriada to residencial, among others.

Special Communities

 (Special Communities of Puerto Rico) are marginalized communities whose citizens are experiencing a certain amount of social exclusion. A map shows these communities occur in nearly every municipality of the commonwealth. Of the 742 places that were on the list in 2014, the following barrios, communities, sectors, or neighborhoods were in Toa Alta: Comunidad Acerolas, Sector Cuba Libre, Sector La Prá, Villa del Río, Villa Josco, and Villa Juventud.

Demographics

Tourism

Landmarks and places of interest
Legendary tree Bala de Cañón
Tomás "Maso" Rivera Municipal Theatre
Tomás "Maso" Rivera Statue
Egozcué Square public plaza
San Fernando Rey Parish Church
Villa Tropical Recreation Center
Plaza Aquarium Mall
Valle El Toa

Economy

Culture

Festivals and events
Toa Alta celebrates its patron saint festival in May. The  is a religious and cultural celebration that generally features parades, games, artisans, amusement rides, regional food, and live entertainment.

 or the Festival of the Mechanical Bull is held in October.

Other festivals and events celebrated in Toa Alta include La Chopa Marathon, held in March, and Folk Music Festival, held in November.

Government

Like all municipalities in Puerto Rico, Toa Alta is administered by a mayor. The current mayor is Clemente Agosto, from the Popular Democratic Party (PPD). Agosto was elected at the 2012 general election.

The city belongs to the Puerto Rico Senatorial district II, which is represented by two senators. Migdalia Padilla and Carmelo Ríos Santiago have served as District Senators since 2005.

Transportation
There are 16 bridges in Toa Alta. In January, 2019 the mayor of Toa Alta fought for the reopening of highway #861, which, he stated, was closed without warning by Puerto Rico Public Works.

Symbols
The  has an official flag and coat of arms.

Flag
Horizontally divided in three, the bottom and top red stripes are double the size of the center yellow stripe. In the upper left corner is a yellow, eight-point star. The original design was elaborated by professor Herman E. Perez and adopted by the City Council in 1983.

Coat of arms
The shield in gold, a red board with a silver sword topped with a gold crown of the same metal, to each side two small shields in red, the right-hand one with a tower in gold with a crescent moon on the top and the left-hand one with a gold eight point star, a five tower crown lined in black with red openings. The motto is Non Deserit Alta and Professor Herman E. Pérez included it in the coat of arms so that present and future generations will remember to “not abandon higher principles and values”.

Education
There are several public and private schools in Toa Alta and public education is handled by the Puerto Rico Department of Education.

Elementary schools
Alejandro Junior Cruz
Heraclio Rivera Colón
José de Diego
José María del Valle
Luis Muñoz Rivera
Manuel Velilla
María C. Osorio
Merced Marcano
Secundino Díaz
Violanta Jiménez
Virgilio Morales

Middle and junior high schools
José Pablo Morales
Abelardo Díaz Alfaro
Felipe Díaz González

High schools
Adela Rolón Fuentes
Nicolás Sevilla
Tomás "Maso" Rivera Morales

Private schools
Academia Cristiana Yarah
Colegio Doriber

Notable natives and residents
Sergeants José Díaz and Francisco Díaz – defended Puerto Rico from a British invasion in 1797
Dayanara Torres Delgado – Miss Universe 1993

See also

List of Puerto Ricans
History of Puerto Rico
Did you know-Puerto Rico?

References

Further reading

External links 
 Toa Alta and its barrios, United States Census Bureau

Municipalities of Puerto Rico
San Juan–Caguas–Guaynabo metropolitan area
Populated places established in 1751
1751 establishments in the Spanish West Indies
1750s in Puerto Rico